The CS/LR4 7.62 Millimeter High-Precision Sniper System, also known as NSG-1, is a type of bolt-action sniper rifle designed and manufactured by Chinese company Norinco. The weapon is chambered with CS/DFL3 (7.62×51mm) high-precision cartridge in a 5-round box magazine. The rifle features a free-floating barrel and specifically designed munition that improves accuracy. The rifle also accepts other .308 Winchester ammo. 

The CS/LR4 is called a "Sniper System" because it consists of not only a rifle, but also dedicated telescopic sights, specifically designed ammunition, a ballistic calculation/rangefinder binocular, and other accessories.

Design and development
The CS/LR4 is the successor to the JS 7.62mm sniper rifle, which was designed by Jianshe Industries (Group) Corporation of Chongqing in 2003. The development of the CS/LR4 started around 2008. The weapon system was adopted by the Chinese police force and People's Armed Police around 2012. The weapon does not have an official military designation from the People's Liberation Army and only saw limited use by special operation forces.

The CS/LR4 is largely similar to 5.8×42mm CS/LR3 (QBU-141) with an enlarged, accurized barrel chambered in 7.62×51mm. The gun is a manually operated bolt-action rifle. It features rotary bolt and free-floating barrel. A fixed, thumb-hole style stock is made from polymer, with fully adjustable (top-down and front-rear) buttpad, cheek rest, and integrated monopod. A segment of picatinny rail is mounted on top of the ejection window, with another segment mounted on top of the barrel for thermal/night vision sight. The picatinny rail is supported by the handguard without touching the barrel, thus maintaining the accuracy provided by the free-floating design. CS/LR4 has a double-stage trigger to facilitate precision shooting, and the pull weight can be customized between 8N and 15N.

The assorted sighting device of the CS/LR4 system includes CS/OS15 (8x-32x) daylight scope, CS/OS20A (4x-15x) daylight scope, and night-vision devices.

CS/LR4A

CS/LR4A is the improved variant of CS/LR4. CS/OS15 (8x-32x) scope is improved with wider field of view (FOV). A new scope with better ergonomics design and lower magnification (4x-15x) called CS/OS20 is also introduced.

CS/LR35

CS/LR35 is the further development of CS/LR4. CS/LR35 is available in two versions chambered in either 7.62×51mm NATO or 8.6×70mm Lapua Magnum. Improvements include reinforced material for the barrel, lightweight rifle body, fully adjustable folding stock, and CS/DEL3A high precision cartridge in a 5-round box magazine.

The 8.6×70mm variant of the rifle can be differentiated by its slightly longer barrel with a handguard that only has four ventilation holes whereas the 7.62 variant has seven smaller ones.

In Chinese military service, 8.6×70mm variant of the CS/LR35 received designation QBU-202 with its scope designated QMK-201 variable zoom optics. 7.62×51mm variant of the CS/LR35 received designation QBU-203 with its scope designated QMK-201A.

Variants

JS 7.62mm Prototype designed by Jianshe Industries (Group) Corporation in 2003. First marketed in 2005. The weapon is chambered in 7.62×54mmR.
CS/LR4 The successor to JS 7.62mm. Chambered in 7.62×51mm.
CS/LR4A Improved version of CS/LR4 with reduced weight and longer barrel. Chambered in 7.62×51mm. Accuracy is improved to ≤1MOA (at ) and overall longer effective range.
CS/LR35 Military designation QBU-202 and QBU-203. Improved version of CS/LR4. Chambered in 8.6×70mm Lapua Magnum and 7.62×51mm.

Users

:
People's Armed Police, People's Police of China, People's Liberation Army Special Operations Forces - CS/LR4, CS/LR4A.
People's Liberation Army Ground Force - QBU-202, QBU-203.
: Philippine Army - CS/LR4A.
: Venezuelan Marine Corps - CS/LR4

See also
CS/LR3
CS/LR35

References

Sniper rifles of the People's Republic of China
7.62×51mm NATO rifles
Bolt-action rifles